Kittredge is an unincorporated town, a post office, and a census-designated place (CDP) located in and governed by Jefferson County, Colorado, United States. The CDP is a part of the Denver–Aurora–Lakewood, CO Metropolitan Statistical Area. The Kittredge post office has the ZIP code 80457. At the United States Census 2010, the population of the Kittredge CDP was 1,304, while the population of the 80457 ZIP Code Tabulation Area was 612.

History
The Kittredge Post Office has been in operation since 1923. C. M. Kittredge, an early postmaster, gave the community his name.

Geography
Kittredge is located in the valley of Bear Creek. Colorado State Highway 74 leads east down Bear Creek Canyon  to Morrison and southwest (upstream)  to Evergreen.

Demographics

Education
Kittredge is served by the Jefferson County Public Schools.

Notable residents
Kittredge is the home of former U.S. Senator and U.S. Presidential aspirant Gary Hart.

See also

Outline of Colorado
Index of Colorado-related articles
State of Colorado
Colorado cities and towns
Colorado census designated places
Colorado counties
Jefferson County, Colorado
List of statistical areas in Colorado
Front Range Urban Corridor
North Central Colorado Urban Area
Denver-Aurora-Boulder, CO Combined Statistical Area
Denver-Aurora-Broomfield, CO Metropolitan Statistical Area

References

External links

Kittredge @ Colorado.com
Kittredge @ UncoverColorado.com
Jefferson County website
Jeffco Public Schools

Census-designated places in Jefferson County, Colorado
Census-designated places in Colorado
Denver metropolitan area